Lado Radi is a 2010 Pakistani Punjabi film directed by Masood Butt, starring Shaan Shahid and  actress Sila Hussain. This film did an average amount of business at the box office. Film director Masood Butt has turned out some blockbuster Punjabi movies in the past for example Badmash Gujjar in 2001 but was not as lucky this time.

References

Punjabi-language Pakistani films
2010 films
2010s Punjabi-language films